Björn Nilsson, better known by his stage name Kapten Röd, ("Captain Red", in Swedish), is a dancehall/ragga artist and music producer from Gothenburg, Sweden.

He initially released the single "Visa ingen nåd"/"En storm är på väg" in the formation Kungariket with Tommy Tip. Kungariket was often joined by band Majorerna. In 2007, he produced Stjärnorna finns här, the debut album for General Knas and Calle P. Kapten Röd. He promoted the album through taking part in a number of festivals and club gigs. In autumn 2007 he toured as Kapten Röd (literally Captain Red), with backing band Majorerna, on a tour with the Svenska Akademien. In 2008, he was also part of Kingsfarm Guerilla under the alias Frenemy. He also produced for other artists like Roffe Ruff, Million Stylez, The Serengeti, Promoe, Ziggi and Papa Dee. He released the single "En miljon nollor" ( literally meaning "one million zeros", but also means "one million losers") at the end of 2010 and the album Fläcken som aldrig går bort on 6 July 2011. He is considered a leading name in the reggae scene in Gothenburg.

Discography

Albums
2007: Stjärnorna finns här
2011: Fläcken som aldrig går bort
Compilation album
2007: Du ska inte tro det blir sommar

Singles

Featured in

Notes

References

External links 
 

Swedish male musicians
Swedish record producers
Swedish-language singers
Living people
1983 births